TSP-2 can refer to:
 a Thrombospondin
 a tetraspanin